Futurology refers to Futures Studies. It might also refer to:
 Futurology (album)
 Futurology (song)